Hunter B. Shirley (December 25, 1927 – November 1, 2010) born Hunter Barentine Shirley, was a longtime licensed clinical psychologist and a former associate professor at Wisconsin State University where he headed a psychological research laboratory devoted to evaluating the world's first analog model of the mind. He was most recently the Director of the International Division of the American Institute of Applied Behavioral Research and Human Relations Training. Formerly Director of Behavior Analysis, Inc. of St. Louis subsequently he was director of the Counseling and Testing Center at the University of Louisiana at Lafayette, and later served as the Chief Clinical Psychologist of the Lafayette Institute of Behavior Therapy and Crisis Management. Author of a number of books, including the trail-blazing book Mapping the Mind, and the popular self-help book Your Mind May Be Programmed Against You!. He is credited with having developed the most sophisticated model of the human mind currently in existence. With offices in Staré Splavy near Prague, Shirley was in charge of a "Think tank" performing behavioral science research for NGOs and government agencies. His final work The Human Mind: A Guided Tour, a comprehensive compilation of his theories on the emotional system and the human mind developed over a lifetime of clinical and field studies, is in the final phases of editing in preparation for publication. This book includes over 300 diagrams of the emotional system based on a cybernetics approach as he first presented in his book Mapping The Mind and in numerous published articles.

Works
 (1972) Psychovector analysis: A new discipline within the behavioral sciences. Journal of Psychology, 80, 135 – 145.
 (1976) Emotion as a Three-Valued Variable. Psychological Reports
 (1977) Toward an Operable Simulation Model of Personality. Journal of Psychology
 (1981) Your Mind May Be Programmed Against You
 (1983) Mapping The Mind  
 (1996) An Introduction to Psychofeedback Training: Paper presented to the Slovenian National Academy of the Arts and Science
 (2000) The Uses of Psychofeedback Training in Psychiatry. An address delivered to the Palackeho University Medical School, Olomouc, Czech Republic
 (2003) Designing "Hard Science" Type Models of Perception, Cognition, and Memory. Theory and Science 4:2]
 (2004) " Psychofeedback training: Mood Monitoring.  Personality Study and Group Behavior Vol.24

Private life

Hunter B. Shirley married Anne Shirley. He had three children Faustine, Remy and Raphaele Shirley. In 1995 he moved from Lafayette, Louisiana, where he held a private practice for over 15 years, to Central Europe. There he remarried Ava Shirley with whom he lived for the last ten years of his life until he died in 2010 in Česká Lípa in the Czech Republic.

American clinical psychologists
American psychology writers
American male non-fiction writers
1927 births
2010 deaths